Nebrowo Wielkie  is a village in the administrative district of Gmina Sadlinki, within Kwidzyn County, Pomeranian Voivodeship, in northern Poland.

The village has a population of 310.

References

Nebrowo Wielkie